The series aired on tvN from January 7 to February 26, 2013, on Mondays and Tuesdays at 23:00 (KST) time slot for 16 episodes. Directed by Jung Jung-hwa (who previously helmed Flower Boy Ramyun Shop) and written by movie screenwriter Kim Eun-jung (Gabi, Hwang Jin-yi), it is the third installment of cable channel tvN's "Oh! Boy" series of Flower Boy programming targeted at the teenage demographic.

Synopsis
Go Dok-mi (in Korean, literally "lonely beauty")(played by Park Shin-hye) is a shy, frugal freelance copy editor who refuses to leave her apartment or interact with people as much as possible. Every day, using a pair of binoculars, she steals peeks at her neighbor across the street, Han Tae-joon, as he goes through his daily morning routine. She had fallen in love with Tae-joon at first sight, after witnessing him pick up a puppy in a box and taking it home. When she looked out her window and saw him living in the apartment opposite hers, she thought of it as fate.

Webtoon artist Oh Jin-rak (Kim Ji-hoon) lives in the same apartment building as Dok-mi. He has been in love with Dok-mi for ages, and anonymously leaves a carton of milk with a post-it attached by her door every day. He created a webtoon with his drawing partner Oh Dong-hoon (Go Kyung-pyo), titled "Flower Boy Next Door", based on Dok-mi's life as well as his desire to draw her out into the world.

Enrique Geum (Yoon Shi-yoon), a genius video game developer, arrives in Seoul from Spain. His reason for coming is "cupid's arrow". Though he's in love with his best friend Yoon Seo-young (Kim Yoon-hye), she has feelings instead for his older cousin, Han Tae-joon, so he intends to play cupid for the two. That same day, a new neighbor Watanabe Ryu moves into the apartment across to Dok-mi and Jin-rak.

When Enrique comes to stay at Tae-joon's apartment, he catches Dok-mi in the act. Naturally curious and inquisitive, Enrique decides to find out the reason why Dok-mi is living in recluse. Meanwhile, Jin-rak is threatened by Enrique's sudden intrusion into Dok-mi's life.
    
With all these new men suddenly entering her life, Dok-mi's solitary and orderly world is turned upside down.

Cast

Main
 Park Shin-hye as Go Dok-mi
A modern Rapunzel, she has locked herself up in her "tower" to hide from the world.    
 Yoon Shi-yoon as Enrique Geum
A genius who developed a wildly successful video game at 17, he is fun-loving, talkative, bohemian and can't get enough of soccer.
 Kim Ji-hoon as Oh Jin-rak/Oh Jae-won
A rookie webtoon artist, he is attractive despite his difficult and stubborn personality. He is in love with Dok-mi.

Supporting
 Go Kyung-pyo as Oh Dong-hoon
Jin-rak's roommate and drawing partner who freeloads off him, and is known around the neighborhood for his chic looks and wiles.  
 Park Soo-jin as Cha Do-hwi
A businesswoman who runs a shopping mall. She projects an elegant, easygoing image, but her friendliness doesn't extend to Dok-mi, whom she bullied in high school. She falls in love with Jin-rak and tries to win his heart. Her childhood best friend was Go Dok-mi while in elementary school.
 Kim Yoon-hye as Yoon Seo-young
Enrique's best friend and first love. She is a free spirit who throws herself wholeheartedly after something she wants.   
 Kim Jung-san as Han Tae-joon
Enrique's older cousin. He has a complicated relationship with Seo-young, and is liked from afar by Dok-mi.   
 Mizuta Kouki as Watanabe Ryu
The new Japanese neighbor who came to Korea to learn the cuisine. 
 Kim Seul-gi as Kim Seul-gi
Jin-rak and Dong-hoon's webtoon editor and the deputy manager of the Contents Development team.

Special appearances
 Lee Jong-hyuk as Hongdae guru (ep. 1)
 Park Se-young as new artist who's similar to Dok-mi (ep. 16)

Original soundtrack
 Flower Boys Next Door (Title) - 이크거북
 Ready-Merry-Go! - Romantic Punch
 Talkin' Bout Love - J Rabbit
 I Wish It Was You - Lee Jung 
 Pitch Black -	Park Shin-hye 
 I Want to Date You - Yoon Shi-yoon
 Memories of That Day - 이크거북
 I Wake Up Because of You - Kim Seul-gi feat. Go Kyung-pyo
 Look at Me - Son Ho-young
 Pitch Black (Acoustic ver.) - Park Shin-hye
 I Wish It Was You (Inst.) 
 Talkin' Bout Love (Inst.) 
 I Want to Date You (Inst.)
 I Wake Up Because of You (Inst.)
 Ready-Merry-Go! (Inst.)
 About Her (That Woman's Story Theme) - 이크거북

Ratings
In this table,  represent the lowest ratings and  represent the highest ratings.

Awards and nominations

International broadcast
Broadcasting rights were sold to Japan for the highest price yet for a Korean cable series; it began airing in May 2013 on TBS. It also aired in ten other Asian countries, including China, Hong Kong, Singapore, Thailand, the Philippines,  Indonesia and Myanmar, and is available to stream on Iflix in Sri Lanka with English subtitles.

References

External links
  
 
 
 I Steal Peeks At Him Every Day webtoon at Daum 

Korean-language television shows
TVN (South Korean TV channel) television dramas
2013 South Korean television series debuts
2013 South Korean television series endings
South Korean romantic comedy television series
Television shows based on South Korean webtoons
Television series by CJ E&M
Television series by Oh! Boy Project